The Senior LPGA Championship is a women's professional golf tournament on the Legends Tour. It began in 2017 and the first event was played at The Pete Dye Course in French Lick, Indiana. The minimum age is 45.

Despite the 2015 announcement by the United States Golf Association that a U.S. Senior Women's Open would be added from 2018,  for competitors aged 50 or over, the eligibility for the Senior LPGA Championship and the Legends Tour remained to be for female golfers age 45 and older, meaning not all Senior LPGA Championship players are eligible for the U.S. Senior Women's Open.

Winners

References

External links

Coverage on the Legends Tour's official site

Legends Tour
Women's golf tournaments in the United States
Senior women's major golf championships
Recurring sporting events established in 2017
2017 establishments in Indiana